Schinia macneilli is a moth of the family Noctuidae. It is found in California.

The wingspan is about 22 mm.

External links
Images
Butterflies and Moths of North America

Schinia
Moths of North America
Moths described in 1996